Leslie Charles Spikes (born January 23, 1951) is a former Major League Baseball outfielder who played from 1972 through 1980 for the New York Yankees, Cleveland Indians, Detroit Tigers, and Atlanta Braves. He also played 26 games for the Chunichi Dragons in Japan in 1981. His playing career nickname was "The Bogalusa Bomber."

Spikes was drafted in the first round of the 1969 Major League Baseball Draft by the Yankees. He made his major league debut with the Yankees in 1972. He, along with John Ellis, Rusty Torres and Jerry Kenney, was traded from the Yankees to the Indians for Graig Nettles and Jerry Moses at the Winter Meetings on November 27, 1972. His best season was in 1974 for the Indians, when he hit .271 with 22 home runs and 80 RBI. He played for the Indians through the 1977 season. He was dealt to the Tigers for Tom Veryzer at the Winter Meetings on December 9, 1977.

References

External links

, or Retrosheet, or SABR Biography Project

1951 births
Living people
African-American baseball players
American expatriate baseball players in Japan
Atlanta Braves players
Baseball players from Louisiana
Chunichi Dragons players
Cleveland Indians players
Detroit Tigers players
Evansville Triplets players
Fort Lauderdale Yankees players
Grambling State Tigers baseball players
Johnson City Yankees players
Kinston Eagles players
Major League Baseball left fielders
Major League Baseball right fielders
People from Bogalusa, Louisiana
New York Yankees players
Tigres de Aragua players
American expatriate baseball players in Venezuela
Toledo Mud Hens players
West Haven Yankees players
21st-century African-American people
20th-century African-American sportspeople